Somarama is one of the five Pancharama Kshetras that are sacred to the Hindu god Shiva. The temple is located in Bhimavaram of West Godavari district in the Indian state of Andhra Pradesh. It is one of the centrally protected monuments of national importance.

Architecture and history
This temple is an old but looks like a new one because of paintings on the walls and sculptures.

At the front of the temple is a lotus covered pond called Chandrakundam, and there is a large Gopuram at the temple entrance. In the left side of temple there is a big hall in which temples of Lord Srirama and Hanuma are present.

On the right side of temple there is an open hall above the temple office. When a crowd is present, pujaris/pandits conduct puja here for individuals. The temple has many sculptures. In the hall of temple there is a big statue of Nandi. After crossing hall there is a room in front of sanctum. In that room there is a temple of Annapurna mata.

In the sanctum Lord Shiva is in the form of a beautiful Shivaling. Shivaling in this temple is small unlike in other Pancharamas. There is a specialty in this temple: Shivaling will change its color according to Lunar aspect. At the time of Pournami (full moon nights) shivaling will be in white color and during Amavasya days (dark nights) its color shades black.

Another unique feature is that the temple of Goddess Annapurna was built on top of the Shiva temple, something that cannot be seen anywhere in the country. Surprisingly, the Goddess has the sacred thread around her neck and a baby near her feet.

Here Lord Shiva is known as Someswara Swamy. The consort of Lord Someswara is Sri Rajarajeswari Ammavaru. The Sivalinga at this place is installed and established by Lord Chandra. Maha Shivaratri and Sarannavarathri are the main festivals celebrated at this temple.

To the south of the Garbha Gruham, Goddess Adilakshmi can be seen and wedding hall at ground and first floor are constructed. Marriages are conducted both in the new hall and also in Goddess Annapurna mantapam.

To the east side of this temple, there is a Pushkarini pond which is also called Soma Gundam. Inside the temple, Lord Anjaneya Swamy, God Kumara Swamy, Navagraha, Sun God, Lord Ganesha can be seen. In front of the main entrance, a 15-foot pillar is constructed. The pond in front of the entrance is always covered by lotus flowers.

References

Bhimavaram
Hindu temples in West Godavari district
Hindu holy cities
Hindu pilgrimage sites in India
Pancharama Kshetras
State protected monuments in Andhra Pradesh
Shiva temples in Andhra Pradesh